Wild Blood is a 1915 American silent short drama film directed by and starring William Garwood in the lead role with Violet Mersereau.

It was produced by the Independent Moving Pictures Company of America.

Cast
 Violet Mersereau as Bess Browne - Mountain Girl
 William Garwood as Walt Hiller

External links

1915 films
1915 drama films
Silent American drama films
American silent short films
American black-and-white films
1915 short films
1910s American films
1910s English-language films
American drama short films